Urszula Radwańska was the defending champion, but chose not to participate.

Anne Keothavong won the title defeating Yvonne Meusburger in the final 6–3, 1–6, 6–2.

Seeds

Main draw

Finals

Top half

Bottom half

References
 Main Draw
 Qualifying Draw

Buschl Open - Singles
Ismaning Open